Toussidé (also known as Tarso Toussidé) is a potentially active stratovolcano in Chad. Toussidé lies in the Tibesti Mountains, the large Yirrigué caldera and the smaller Trou au Natron and Doon Kidimi craters are close to it. The volcano is the source of a number of lava flows, which have flowed westward away from Toussidé and east into the Yirrigué caldera.

During the last glacial maximum or the early-middle Holocene, it was filled with a lake. A number of volcanic cones have developed within Trou au Natron. Fumarolic activity on the peak of Toussidé and geothermal manifestations within Trou au Natron represent signs of volcanic activity at Toussidé.

Names 
Toussidé is also known as Tarso Toussidé. "Trou au Natron" refers to the springs which have deposited white trona in the caldera. "Toussidé" translates as "Which killed the local people (Tou) with fire".

Geography and geomorphology

Regional 
Toussidé is part of the western Tibesti mountains in Chad, Africa. The towns of Bardai and Zouar lie east-northeast and south of Toussidé, respectively, and a road between the two passes just southeast from Trou au Natron.

Another volcano in Tibesti is Emi Koussi, which is the highest mountain of the Tibesti and of the entire Sahara region. The origin of volcanism in Tibesti is unclear; both a hotspot-related mechanism and tectonic effects of the collision between the African Plate and the Eurasian Plate have been proposed.

Local 
In the past it was considered to be lower, only , before a higher summit height was determined by Jean Tilho and W.G. Tweedale (1920). The summit cone is formed by lapilli, pyroclastics and scoria, one half has a white colour and the other half is black; some areas are white from fumarolic alteration. These flows descended valleys towards the west and may have buried an older volcanic edifice of Toussidé. The flows have a ropy appearance with a diverse surface texture, including bubbly, glassy and porphyric textures, which are very fresh and free of erosion. The surface of the flows is rough and can be a problem to climbers. The relatively steep slopes of Toussidé may reflect the existence of a lava dome underneath the younger lavas; some flows may have originated from parasitic vents.

Toussidé itself lies in part within an even larger caldera, the  "pre-Toussidé" (also known as "Yirrigué") caldera which is in part filled by the lava flows from Toussidé and eruption products from the more recent explosion craters, as well as debris that fell from the steep caldera margin. Toussidé is located on the caldera's western side, and the smaller Trou au Natron caldera cuts into the flanks of Yirrigué. The "Yirrigué" caldera is part of a large rhyolitic shield-shaped volcano that developed on top of a tectonic horst, which in turn may have been formed by intrusion of magmas. The ignimbrites have buried older terrain and filled valleys.

In places it is almost vertical. Three of these cones are deeply eroded. Cones are also located outside of the Trou au Natron, and their eruption products have in part flowed into the crater. Like Toussidé, the position of Trou au Natron appears to be controlled by the ring fault of the "pre-Toussidé" caldera. A salty swamp lies within Trou au Natron, whose floor is in part covered by evaporites, mainly sodium sulfate.

The river Enneri Oudingueur originates closely in the area and becomes a tributary of the Enneri Bardagué, which drains the Tibesti northward.

Paleolake 
Trou Au Natron was once filled by a freshwater lake during the last glacial maximum. Fed by meltwater from snow, this lake persisted for several thousands of years. Aside from a lake level drop between 14,90014,600 years before present, the lake existed until about 12,400 years before present. Later analysis suggested that there was no late Pleistocene lake stage and that Trou au Natron was filled with water between 8,645 calibrated radiocarbon years ago to about 4,425 calibrated radiocarbon years ago, thus at the same time as lakes in the lowland. Charophyte algae (such as Chara globularis and Chara vulgaris), diatoms, gastropods, golden algae, sponges and stromatoliths lived in the lake. Ferns and mosses colonized the margins of the crater.

The lake reached maximum depths of at a minimum , at least once reaching . Such a large size, relative to its catchment, has raised the question of where this water came from. The formation of such a lake during the glacial maximum was probably dependent on orographic precipitation transported by the subtropical jet stream.

Geology 
The Tibesti Mountains have been volcanically active since the late Cenozoic, with one old volcanic unit being dated to 17 million years ago. While all the higher peaks are volcanoes, not all of Tibesti is formed by volcanic material; the volcanoes have developed on top of a basement uplift.

The terrain beneath Toussidé is formed by Precambrian schists and sandstones, including the Nubian Sandstone. A thick layer of ash has covered much of the terrain and with the exception of the younger volcanoes only few parts of the terrain crop out. Several of these outcrops can be found east of Trou au Natron. The volcanism of the Tibesti has been subdivided into several series.

The volcano has erupted rhyolite, trachybasalt bordering on trachyandesite, which define a subalkaline/hyperalkaline suite. The lavas contain phenocrysts of augite, olivine, plagioclase and sanidine. The cones in Trou au Natron are andesitic. Yirrigué conversely has erupted peralkaline rhyolite, while Ehi Timi erupted rhyolite and trachyte and Ehi Sosso only rhyolite. The formation of Trou au Natron has been accompanied by the eruption of bedrock material.

Climate and vegetation 
At higher altitudes frost can be expected. Most of it falls as frontal precipitation during summer, and it is more copious than in the lowlands; the Tibesti mountains are the sources for wadis.

A characteristic vegetation has been discovered on the fumaroles of Toussidé. It ranges from cyanophyceae, ferns, mosses, Oldenlandia and Selaginella within the fumarole vents to small meadows consisting of mosses and Campanula monodiana, Fimbristylis minutissima, Lavandula antineae, Mollugo nudicaulis, Oxalis corniculata, Satureja biflora and other species. The growth of these plants is favoured by the water emanating from the fumaroles. The plant Erodium toussidanum is endemic at the fumaroles of Toussidé, and the mountain is the type locality of Salvia tibestiensis. Trou au Natron also has its own unique flora, including many Sahelian species.

Eruption history 
Volcanic activity at Toussidé appears to be of Quaternary age. The "pre-Toussidé" caldera is considered to be the source of numerous local ignimbrites, including the 430,000 ± 110,000 year old Yirrigué ignimbrite. The eruption that generated this ignimbrite also led to the formation of the Yirrigué caldera.

Trou au Natron probably formed through two or three separate phreatic eruptions that deposited large blocks around the crater, while an alternative proposal that considers it a collapse caldera appears to not be consistent with field evidence. It formed after the "pre-Toussidé" caldera considering that its caldera rim is cut by Trou au Natron, at a time where part of the Toussidé volcano already existed, but before the Würm glaciation. Doon Kidimi on the other hand may have formed during the Neolithic Subpluvial, and after Trou au Natron.

Toussidé is among the youngest volcanoes in Tibesti, and may have erupted in historical time. Likewise, the volcanic cones in Trou au Natron are considered to be recent, lake deposits underneath the cones have been radiocarbon-dated to be between 15,000 and 12,500 years old. Finally, in Trou au Natron there are hot springs that deposit trona and fumarolic activity has been reported there.

See also

 List of volcanoes in Chad
 List of Ultras of Africa

References

Sources

Other sources
 National Aeronautics and Space Administration
 
 High-resolution NASA photograph

Tibesti Mountains
Holocene stratovolcanoes
Mountains of Chad
Volcanoes of Chad
Potentially active volcanoes
VEI-6 volcanoes